"Sweet Temptation (Hollow)" is the first single from Inside the Hollow, the second album by the Canadian band Lillix.

The video for the single was initially released to MuchMusic, followed by an iTunes release on 1 August 2006. It was listed as the 96th best song of 2006 by Blender magazine.

References                 

Lillix songs
2006 singles
Songs written by James Michael